Ahmed Al Safi (born 1971) is an Iraqi sculptor and painter.

Life and career
Al Safi was born in Al Diwaniyah, Iraq.

He studied sculpture at the Fine Arts Academy in Baghdad. 
He won the Ismail Fatah Al Turk Prize for young sculptors in 2000.

Al Safi's art reflects the concerns of a generation of Iraqi artists in the 1990s who were living through a time of international embargo and homeland dictatorship. Throughout the period of the embargo, Al Safi made sculptures and paintings in his Baghdad studio, his work collected by foreign diplomats and other visitors from the West, as well as collectors from the Middle East.

Known for his attenuated figures cast in bronze, Al Safi's representations of men strive to fly, leap or balance on precarious perches, perhaps reflecting the complex moral balancing act required of so many Iraqis during Saddam Hussein's murderous reign. His work also uses themes from ancient Mesopotamian culture, including agrarian and fishing motifs. Al Safi has lived in France since 2005.

See also

 Iraqi art
 Islamic art
 List of Iraqi artists

Notes

External links
AlSafiArt
Saatchi Gallery
Baghdad Journal - Artnet.com
Mumford, Steve. "Baghdad Journal", artnet, July 12, 2004. Accessed May 19, 2008.

1971 births
20th-century sculptors
20th-century Iraqi painters
21st-century Iraqi painters
21st-century sculptors
Artists from Baghdad
Expressionist painters
Iraqi sculptors
Living people
War artists
Neo-expressionist artists